The Thames Tradesmen's Rowing Club is a rowing club on the Tideway (upper estuary of the Thames) in West London, United Kingdom at Chiswick Boathouse, 100 metres north-west of Barnes Railway & Footbridge – beyond which is Barnes Bridge railway station. Other footpaths link to Old Chiswick, Chiswick High Road and Strand-on-the-Green.

Foundation and colours
The club was established in 1897. Its kit colours are white, claret and green If the claret dates to two years or more later it may be a nod to Thames Ironworks F.C. If adopted later, the order is the same and top colour only a slight shade different from the suffragette flag, devised in 1908 and widely seen until the 1920s.

Ethos
Until 1956, the club was one of the leading and few London members of the National Amateur Rowing Association and helped to bring about the gradual merger with the Amateur Rowing Association for people in 'non-physical' work, to which were affiliated the various clubs on the Putney Embankment. The club continues to stand firmly against social barriers and has inducted and enhanced the fitness and technical ability of rowers including international-standard oarsmen since the 1960s. The club's leaders over decades of the 20th century won its successful campaign with Poplar Blackwall and District Rowing Club and other NARA clubs – most of which were from the industrial heartlands of Britain – for non-exclusivity in rowing events and national teams, as evidenced in Rowing in England: A Social History. These two clubs in London thus have the strongest record of openness and widening of participation. GB Rowing now has many leading athletes who are not alumni of the old, well-endowed schools and universities which set up the earliest competitions in the sport.

Training
Thames Tradesmen compete in the Head of the River Race and its three offshoots for smaller boats than eights each year. The club organizes a training camp each year before Henley Royal Regatta. During the Summer Season, TTRC is prominent on the regatta circuit and look to peak at Henley and The National Championships.

Setting
Alongside Barnes Bridge Ladies Rowing Club, the club is the closest club to Barnes, much of Chiswick, Acton, the London Borough of Brent and Roehampton. Its size and dedicated long slipway make it attractive to schools and in subscription price for central, west, north-west and south-west London. Its coaching/coxes rooms and broad boat bays are in a very large two-storey building. The upstairs is a shared clubroom and ten changing rooms sponsored by the local London borough divided up at weekends with two clubs sharing the rugby and football fields adjoining.

Its clubroom and shared lounge is large and overlooks most of Barnes's ornate riverside buildings.

Honours

Henley Royal Regatta

Recent British champions

Notes and references
Notes 
  
References

See also 
Rowing on the River Thames

Tideway Rowing clubs
Sports clubs established in 1897
1897 establishments in England
Sport in the London Borough of Hounslow
Rowing clubs of the River Thames